Peter Lupčo (born 21 April 1995) is a Slovak football midfielder who currently plays for Tatran Prešov.

MŠK Žilina
He made his Corgoň Liga debut for Žilina against Spartak Trnava on 21 October 2012.

External links
 UEFA profile

References

1995 births
Living people
Slovak footballers
Association football midfielders
MŠK Žilina players
MFK Karviná players
FK Poprad players
FC Nitra players
MFK Lokomotíva Zvolen players
KFC Komárno players
1. FC Tatran Prešov players
Expatriate footballers in the Czech Republic
Slovak Super Liga players
2. Liga (Slovakia) players
Czech National Football League players
People from Vranov nad Topľou
Sportspeople from the Prešov Region